Fairfield is a suburb to the northeast of central Hamilton, New Zealand. Fairfield is named after the dairy farm of John Davies, who bought 100 acres (0.40 km2) from F. R. Claude. This area experienced rapid growth in the 1950s and 60s.

History
Fairfield is named after the dairy farm of John Davies, who bought  from F. R. Claude. This area experienced rapid growth in the 1950s and 60s.

Features of Fairfield

Fairfield Bridge

Fairfield Bridge crosses the Waikato River and connects Fairfield with suburbs west of the river. It is a  reinforced concrete road bridge, and well-known landmark. The bridge was built by Caesar Roose in 1936. It has a twin further north on the Waikato River at Tuakau.

Demographics

Fairfield had a population of 4,383 at the 2018 New Zealand census, an increase of 390 people (9.8%) since the 2013 census, and an increase of 435 people (11.0%) since the 2006 census. There were 1,410 households, comprising 2,112 males and 2,271 females, giving a sex ratio of 0.93 males per female. The median age was 29.0 years (compared with 37.4 years nationally), with 1,173 people (26.8%) aged under 15 years, 1,104 (25.2%) aged 15 to 29, 1,701 (38.8%) aged 30 to 64, and 405 (9.2%) aged 65 or older.

Ethnicities were 55.0% European/Pākehā, 42.3% Māori, 10.8% Pacific peoples, 7.7% Asian, and 4.4% other ethnicities. People may identify with more than one ethnicity.

The percentage of people born overseas was 16.9, compared with 27.1% nationally.

Although some people chose not to answer the census's question about religious affiliation, 48.8% had no religion, 33.1% were Christian, 4.0% had Māori religious beliefs, 0.6% were Hindu, 3.6% were Muslim, 1.0% were Buddhist and 2.9% had other religions.

Of those at least 15 years old, 540 (16.8%) people had a bachelor's or higher degree, and 705 (22.0%) people had no formal qualifications. The median income was $22,800, compared with $31,800 nationally. 282 people (8.8%) earned over $70,000 compared to 17.2% nationally. The employment status of those at least 15 was that 1,380 (43.0%) people were employed full-time, 420 (13.1%) were part-time, and 291 (9.1%) were unemployed.

A study based on the 2013 census said that the suburb was a deprived and below-average area, apart from housing.

Education
The school was founded in 1958.

Fairfield Intermediate is a state intermediate (years 7-8) school.

Fairfield Primary School and Woodstock School are contributing primary (years 1-6) state schools. Fairfield Primary opened in 1919. Woodstock School was founded in 1954.

All these schools are coeducational. Rolls are as of

See also
List of streets in Hamilton
Suburbs of Hamilton, New Zealand

References

External links
 Farfield Primary School
 St Joseph's Catholic School
 Woodstock School

Suburbs of Hamilton, New Zealand
Bridges completed in 1937
Populated places on the Waikato River